Ventriloquist Cat is an MGM animated film, directed by Hollywood director Tex Avery. The film was released in the US with the movie The Big Hangover on May 27, 1950.
It stars Spike and Blackie the Cat.

Plot
Blackie the Cat is being chased by Spike after he is caught writing on the fence "I hate Dogs!" In order to escape, Blackie inadvertently jumps into a box full of assorted tricks and discovers a ventriloquist's device for throwing his voice. With his newly acquired powers of ventriloquism, Blackie plays a series of practical jokes on the bulldog. Ultimately, the jokes backfire on Blackie after he discards the device.

Voice cast
Tex Avery as Spike
Tex Avery and Red Coffey as Blackie

Remake as Cat's Meow

Ventriloquist Cat was later remade in CinemaScope as Cat's Meow, which was released on January 25, 1957. It was one of two Avery MGM cartoons to have been reworked in the widescreen format (the other was the 1949 Droopy cartoon Wags to Riches, which was redone as Millionaire Droopy); as Avery himself was long gone from MGM at the time of these remakes, the new versions were worked on by the Hanna-Barbera unit, despite having Avery's name credited on the title card.

References

External links

Films directed by Tex Avery
1950 animated films
1950 short films
Metro-Goldwyn-Mayer animated short films
1950s animated short films
1950s American animated films
Animated films about cats
Films scored by Scott Bradley
Animated films about dogs
Films produced by Fred Quimby
Ventriloquism
Metro-Goldwyn-Mayer cartoon studio short films
1950s English-language films
American animated short films
Metro-Goldwyn-Mayer short films